The Occidental Arts & Ecology Center (OAEC) is a non-profit organization located near the town of Occidental in the western part of Sonoma County, California. Situated on an 80-acre ecological reserve near the Russian River, OAEC works with communities in the region to restore and build cultural and biological diversity.

Community 
The OAEC was initially founded by a group of friends as a non-profit in conjunction with its original company The Sowing Circle.

Resilient community design assists individuals or groups of people to adapt methodologies of permaculture design. OAEC uses this design as a way to teach and guide the surrounding communities to create their own sustainable and resilient system based on what their needs are. The OAEC does this throughout 2-week courses year-round on different permaculture subjects, including Greywater, erosion control and stormwater management.

Projects

The WATER Institute 
The WATER Institute is a branch within the OAEC that teaches the importance of watersheds. WATER is an acronym for the components that continue to go into the OAEC institutes core values, Watershed Advocacy, Training, Education & Research. With backgrounds in Biology, Conservation and Ecology working on various projects Co-Directors Brock Dolman and Kate Lundquist create community-based watershed education empowerment and conservation practices. The OAEC WATER Institute creates publications to serve as guides for communities, individual people, or local agencies to use as they move forward in making water-based decisions.

California Onsite Water Association (COWA) 
 Created in 2014, formerly known as the Decentralized Water Policy Council, COWA brings together public and private stakeholders interested in water conservation and land-use strategies in a membership setting. They set out to challenge policies associated with centralized water practices by creating goals to educate the public on beneficial localized water practices, apply best-management practices to private sectors, and work to move toward more advanced legislation and policy on sustainable localized water management.

Russian River Coho Water Resources Partnership 
Funded by the National Fish and Wildlife Foundation and many other partnerships, the Russian River Coho Water Resources Partnership looks to bring and keep water reliability solutions to the Russian River Watershed, solutions that include improving the streamflow and supply of water to help the endangered Coho salmon. Within the rivers 110 miles there are five main tributaries that the partnership has made its priority due to low stream flows and need for urgent recovery paths for the salmon, these include Dutch Bill Creek, Green Valley Creek, Mark West Creek, Mill Creek, and Grape Creek.

California receives a majority of rainfall in the winter and spring months and supplies the streams with enough water, but the challenge lies in the summer and fall months where water is being used for human use. The partnership looks at strategies where water can be stored during the rainy seasons and used for dry months so water is not being pulled during this time to supply human needs. The partnership will work with individuals to look at personal consumption and make conservation strategies that will benefit both people and the fish that rely on this water source.

Bring back the Beaver Campaign 

The North American Beaver is a beneficial keystone species. Beavers create a habitat that benefits surrounding species as well as the environment around them. This ecosystem engineer helps improve habitat for fish, amphibians, mammals, and birds, including endangered species, ultimately increasing species diversity and richness. Their dams can help improve water quantity with increased water storage, and connectivity between water sources, help improve quality by reducing erosion and turbidity, increased nutrient cycling, carbon retention, purify water and retain pollutants.

Bring Back the Beaver Campaign educates communities on these important benefits that the North American Beaver brings to water systems. The campaign also works to blend their knowledge into regulation and policy in California to create a more educated and friendly way in the management of local beavers.

Caltrans Beaver project 
In 2015 Caltrans in the San Luis Obispo area decided to build a new roadway in Prunedale California next to a wetland area where Beaver, Western pond turtles and endangered Red-legged frog lived. The culverts near the newly built road fell victim to damming by the beavers and eventually started to flood causing transportation issues. Instead of Caltrans removing the beavers from the road area, they decided to team up with OAEC WATER Institute to help educate policy makers of San Luis Obispo and come up with a solution that will benefit both parties. The solution they came up with was a flow control device that helped keep the water level low, kept the dam from growing larger and did not affect the surrounding habitat.

References 

Organizations based in Sonoma County, California
Non-profit organizations based in the San Francisco Bay Area
Environmental organizations based in the San Francisco Bay Area